Texella is a genus of armoured harvestmen in the family Phalangodidae. There are more than 20 described species in Texella.

Species
These 21 species belong to the genus Texella:

 Texella bifurcata (Briggs, 1968)
 Texella bilobata Ubick & Briggs, 1992
 Texella brevidenta Ubick & Briggs, 1992
 Texella brevistyla Ubick & Briggs, 1992
 Texella cokendolpheri Ubick & Briggs, 1992
 Texella deserticola Ubick & Briggs, 1992
 Texella diplospina Ubick & Briggs, 1992
 Texella fendi Ubick & Briggs, 1992
 Texella grubbsi Ubick & Briggs, 1992
 Texella hardeni Ubick & Briggs, 1992
 Texella homi Ubick & Briggs, 1992
 Texella jungi Ubick & Briggs, 1992
 Texella kokoweef Ubick & Briggs, 1992
 Texella longistyla Ubick & Briggs, 1992
 Texella mulaiki C.J. Goodnight & M.L. Goodnight, 1942
 Texella reddelli C.J. Goodnight & M.L. Goodnight, 1967
 Texella renkesae Ubick & Briggs, 1992
 Texella reyesi Ubick & Briggs, 1992
 Texella shoshone Ubick & Briggs, 1992
 Texella spinoperca Ubick & Briggs, 1992
 Texella welbourni Ubick & Briggs, 1992

References

Further reading

External links

 

Harvestmen
Articles created by Qbugbot